Edgar André may refer to:
 Edgar André (politician)
 Edgar André (footballer)